Anthony Thornton may refer to:

Anthony Thornton (field hockey) (born 1967), New Zealand field hockey player
Anthony Thornton (representative) (1814–1904), U.S. Representative from Illinois
Anthony Thornton (writer) (born 1971), author of The Libertines: Bound Together

See also
Tony Thornton, boxer